Green Jellö SUXX is the name of the second EP released by comedy heavy metal group Green Jellö in 1992.

Track listing

Green Jellÿ albums
1991 EPs